

See also 
 Lists of fossiliferous stratigraphic units in Europe

References 
 

 Bosnia and Herzegovina
 
Bosnia and Herzegovina geography-related lists
Lists of landforms of Bosnia and Herzegovina